The town of Archi (also: Chichkeh) is the center of the Archi District in Kunduz Province, Afghanistan. It is situated in a river valley very close to the border with Tajikistan.

See also
 Kunduz Province

References

Populated places in Kunduz Province